Bangaon is a Block(MCB) in Kamrup rural district, in the state of Assam, India, situated in north bank of river Brahmaputra.

Transport
The village is near Boko and connected to nearby towns and cities like Guwahati by National Highway 37 regular buses and other modes of transportation and parts of country by BAMUNI GAON (BMGN) Railway Station.

See also
 Jambari
 Bamunigaon

References

Kamrup district